Plavno may refer to:

 Czech name of Plauen, Germany
 Plavno, Croatia, a village near Knin